Princess Osayomwanbor Peters better known by her stage name Princess Peters is a Nigerian gospel singer, songwriter, recording and performing artist, actress, film producer, and philanthropist. She started her musical career at a very tender age and launched professionally into music with a debut album in 2007 under Lighthworld Productions.

Life, education and career
Peters was born in Benin City, Edo state, Nigeria. She is the 8th child in a family consisting of ten children. Princess  had her NCE in Biology and Integrated Science in 2006 at College of Education Benin, now Tayo Akpata University, and Benson Idahosa University, to pursue a degree in Mass Communication.

Music career

Princess Peters started singing in the children choir of her local church where she worshipped then with her parents. She professionally started her musical career with a debut album "Kpomwen Ijesu" in 2007 under Lighthworld Productions followed by ERHUN in 2011. She has since then released hit singles and albums including, Urhuese, Ose, Ogboviosa amongst others.

Princess has won and gotten several awards nominations including Maranatha Awards USA alongside other top Nigerian gospel musicians including Mercy Chinwo, Steve Crown, Judikay, Frank Edwards.

Acting career
Peters started acting in her church drama group at the age of 8 and acted in her first movie in 2004. Peters has featured in  movies like; Girls are Not Smiling, About Tomorrow, Home in Exile. She has also produced movies like Destiny Gate; Singles Clinik; Edehi.

Philanthropy
Peters is the founder of Lifted Hands Initiative and Princess Peters Foundation where she carries out her humanitarian work to empower the needy in the society, launching a program "widows rejoice" in 2016 to provide startup business funds to support widows in Benin, Edo State, Nigeria.

Awards and recognition

Album
URHUESE  (2019)
AIGBOVBIOSA (2018)
ERHUN (2011)

Discography

Selected filmography
What's Within (2014)
Destiny Gate 
Home in Exile

Girls Are Not Smiling (2017)
About Tomorrow
Adesuwa
ATM
Desperate Love
Singles Clinik

References

 

1986 births
Living people
Nigerian gospel singers
Benson Idahosa University alumni
Actresses from Edo State
21st-century Nigerian actresses
Nigerian women musicians
Nigerian film producers
Nigerian philanthropists
Nigerian women singers
Nigerian humanitarians
Nigerian songwriters
Nigerian singer-songwriters
Nigerian women film producers
Nigerian film actresses